Taiping Lake Bridge is an arch bridge in the Huangshan District of Huangshan City, Anhui, China. The bridge spans  over the south western arm of Taiping Lake. The bridge  carries four lanes of the G3 Beijing–Taipei Expressway.

See also
List of longest arch bridge spans

References

Bridges in Anhui
Bridges completed in 2007
Arch bridges in China